Helen Buday (born 1962) is an Australian actress and singer. She is known for her role as Savannah Nix in the film Mad Max Beyond Thunderdome. She was awarded Best Actress at the 48th Valladolid International Film Festival in 2003 for her role in Alexandra's Project.

Biography

Buday graduated from the National Institute for Dramatic Art in 1983, and has since become one of Australia's leading theater actresses. She has performed with most theater companies, including roles in A Midsummer Night's Dream, Three Sisters, The Importance of Being Earnest, and A Doll's House.

Buday is also a singer, and she has portrayed the lead roles in My Fair Lady, Cabaret, High Society, and The Three-penny Opera.

She made her major screen debut as Savannah Nix, leader of the feral children, in Mad Max Beyond Thunderdome.

Besides her regular theater work, she has also appeared in various television series including Land of Hope, Secrets, Water Rats, and Stingers.

Filmography

FILM

TELEVISION

Accolades

References

External links
 

1962 births
Australian stage actresses
Living people
20th-century Australian women singers
20th-century Australian actresses
Australian television actresses